The welfare trap (or unemployment trap or poverty trap in British English) theory asserts that taxation and welfare systems can jointly contribute to keep people on social insurance because the withdrawal of means-tested benefits that comes with entering low-paid work causes there to be no significant increase in total income. According to this theory, an individual sees that the opportunity cost of getting a better paying job is too great for too little a financial return, and this can create a perverse incentive to not pursue a better paying job.

Different definitions
The term used for this concept varies depending on country. In the United States, where government benefit payments are colloquially referred to as "welfare", the welfare trap often indicates that a person is completely dependent on benefits, with little or no hope of self-sufficiency. The welfare trap is also known as the unemployment trap or the poverty trap, with both terms frequently being used interchangeably as they often go hand-in-hand, but there are subtle differences.

In other contexts, the terms "welfare trap" and "poverty trap" are clearly distinguished. For example, a Southern African Regional Poverty Network report on social protection clarifies that "poverty trap [means] a structural condition from which people cannot rescue themselves despite their best efforts. A welfare trap in this context, by contrast, refers to the barrier created by means-tested social grants that have in-built perverse incentives." The South African definition is typically used with regard to developing countries.

This concept may include other adverse effects of welfare such as on the family structure: it may encourage the increase in the numbers of single-mother families and divorce rates, as individuals see a distinct benefit in such a lifestyle.

In the UK, there is a distinction between two concepts within the welfare trap:
 The unemployment trap occurs when the net income difference between low-paid work and unemployment benefits is less than work-related costs (bus pass, work clothes, daycare), discouraging movement into work; 
 The poverty trap is the position when means-tested benefit payments are reduced as income rises, combined with income tax and other deductions, with the effect of discouraging work with a higher income, longer hours or acquiring skills. In some cases, if a recipient's wage income rises too much, they may lose some or all of their social assistance.

Causes of welfare traps 
The are two predominant views which look to examine how recipients can become stuck in such traps. The first view examines the behavioural traits of recipients and their inability to climb the socio-economic ladder. This view holds that recipients' lack of necessary traits is a result of their decision-making or individual psychology.

The other view examines analyses of labour supply wherein individuals will act to maximise their utility. This utility acts as a function of the amount of goods and services they can enjoy (their real disposable income) and the amount of non-working time available to them. For example, if a worker is free to choose the amount of hours they work, they will continue to offer more labour until an additional hour of leisure forgone is worth more than the goods and services attained through the additional work. Thus, people strive for a utility maximisation in which individuals may deliberately choose to continue receiving employment benefits, as the opportunity cost of employment is too high for the reduction in means-tested support they would otherwise receive.  

Example: If a person on welfare finds a part-time job that will pay the minimum wage of $5 per hour for eight hours per week (totaling $40), and, of the amount earned per week, $20 is deducted from welfare, there is a net gain of only $20. If the government imposes taxes on the $40, at say 15% ($6), and there may be extra child-care and commuting costs as well since that the person can no longer remain at home all day, the person is now worse off than before getting the job. This result occurs despite performing eight hours of work per week that is productive to society.

Welfare traps in practice

Many western countries have developed complex social safety nets that act to protect vulnerable families and individuals experiencing poverty and destitution. As these individuals aim to move off of welfare, the complex labyrinth of programs and policies - such as the 80 federal anti-poverty programs currently available in the United States - create confusion in the process to understand effects of increased income to means-tested payments.

In the United States, the Congressional Budget Office estimates that median marginal tax rates will rise sharply for taxpayers in the lowest quartile who earn less than 150 percent of the federal poverty level (FPL). For a taxpayer earning less than 50 percent of the FPL, the median marginal tax rate would increase from 14 percent to 34 percent when they find work that places their earnings at just above the poverty line (100-149 percent of the FPL). Following the second view on welfare traps posited earlier, recipients are rational actors and would likely experience material losses in access to goods and services when taxes, loss of leisure time, and support for dependents is factored in.

Avoiding welfare traps 
An incentive to get out of the welfare trap is that the return to the labour market gives a person chances of moving up the career ladder, improving old and acquiring new job skills, etc., thus eventually improving standard of living. Policies that allow for the continued receipt of benefit payments for a period of time after entering work or up to a specific earnings ceiling may also eliminate the welfare trap. For example, for UK claimants of Incapacity Benefit or Employment Support Allowance, "permitted work" arrangements allow for paid work up to either 16 hours or £95 per week without the withdrawal of the disability benefit payments, leading to a net overall increase in income. However, any earnings over £20 may be taxed, and additional earnings may affect receipt of Housing Benefit and Council Tax Benefit, which is an example of the welfare trap remaining potentially in effect. To eliminate the welfare trap entirely would require a policy that permanently continues benefit payments regardless of any conditions, with no income from paid work being withdrawn. One example of this would be unconditional basic income.

See also 

Basic income
Catch-22
Criticisms of welfare
Generational poverty
Means test
Negative income tax
Poverty trap
Welfare's effect on poverty
Workfare

References 

Urban decay
Criticisms of welfare